The 2011 San Francisco 49ers season was the franchise's 66th season overall, and 62nd in the National Football League (NFL). It was the first season under head coach Jim Harbaugh and general manager Trent Baalke. The 49ers rebounded from their disappointing 2010 season to end their streak of eight consecutive non-winning seasons. After defeating the St. Louis Rams in week 13 and attaining a 10–2 record, the team clinched the NFC West and made their first playoff appearance since 2002. The 49ers ended the regular season with a 13–3 record, their best since 1997, and earned a bye in the first round of the playoffs. In the Divisional Playoffs they defeated the New Orleans Saints 36–32 and were in the NFC Championship for the first time since 1997- they lost to the eventual Super Bowl champion New York Giants in overtime by a score of 20–17, coming just short of returning to the Super Bowl for the first time since 1994. 

One of the main catalysts for San Francisco’s return to relevance in 2011 was the team’s dominant defense—specifically against the run. The 49ers yielded the fewest rushing yards in the league (1,236), average yards per rush (3.5), and set an NFL record for fewest rushing touchdowns surrendered in a 16-game regular season (3). The team did not allow a single 100 yard rusher nor a rushing touchdown through the first 14 weeks, and only three of their opponents gained over 100 total yards on the ground. In addition to their dominance against the run, San Francisco’s defense finished second in points allowed (229, or 14.3/g), fourth in yards allowed (308.1/g) second in team interceptions (23), and third in Pro Football Outsiders Defense-adjusted Value Over Average (DVOA) power rankings.

Despite their most successful season in years, the 49ers were 31st in the league in third-down conversion percentage in the regular season (29.1) and were 17.9 percent in the playoffs.

Offseason

Coaching changes
Owner Jed York announced that he would hire a general manager and the new GM would make a decision on the new head coach to replace Mike Singletary after the 49ers' loss to the St. Louis Rams on December 26, 2010 that eliminated the team from the postseason. On January 5, the 49ers promoted the vice president of player personnel, Trent Baalke, to the position of general manager. On January 7, the 49ers hired Stanford head coach Jim Harbaugh to be the 18th head coach of the San Francisco 49ers.

With the hiring of a new head coach, many of the assistant coaches were replaced.  Of the coordinators and position coaches from the previous season, only running backs coach Tom Rathman, defensive line coach Jim Tomsula, and offensive line coach Mike Solari were retained.  The coaching staff featured Greg Roman as the new offensive coordinator and Vic Fangio as the new defensive coordinator, both previously assistant coaches under Harbaugh at Stanford. Former Cleveland Browns assistant head coach and special teams coordinator Brad Seely was hired for the same roles with the 49ers. Geep Chryst was the new quarterbacks coach, Reggie Davis was the new tight ends coach. John Morton was the new wide receivers coach, and Tim Drevno was a new offensive line coach to help out Mike Solari. Jim Leavitt was the new linebackers coach and Ed Donatell was the new secondary coach. The staff also featured defensive assistants Peter Hansen and Ehiro Evero, offensive assistant Bobby Engram, and special assistant to the head coach Bill Nayes.

Roster changes

Free agents

2011 NFL Draft

Draft notes

 The 49ers acquired this fourth-round selection from the San Diego Chargers along with a 2010 third-round selection (#91 overall; used to select LB NaVorro Bowman) and a 2010 sixth-round selection (#173 overall; used to select RB Anthony Dixon) in exchange for a 2010 third-round selection (#79 overall).
 The 49ers acquired this sixth-round selection from the Seattle Seahawks in exchange for DT Kentwan Balmer.
The 49ers acquired this seventh-round selection from the Detroit Lions in exchange for QB Shaun Hill.
 Compensatory selection
 The 49ers acquired this second-round selection from the Denver Broncos in exchange for their second-round selection (#45 overall), a fourth-round selection (#108 overall), and a fifth-round selection (#141 overall).
 The 49ers acquired this third-round selection (#80 overall) and this sixth-round selection (#180 overall) from the Jacksonville Jaguars in exchange for their third-round selection (#76 overall).
 The 49ers acquired this fifth-round selection (#163 overall) from the Green Bay Packers in exchange for their sixth-round selection (#174 overall) and a seventh-round selection (#231 overall).

Personnel

Staff

Roster

Notes
Wide receiver Braylon Edwards was released after nine games.

Preseason

Schedule

Candlestick Park incident
 The preseason game against the Raiders was marked by brawls in the stands and a major beating in a restroom at Candlestick Park. Because of this, the NFL officially canceled all future preseason games between the two teams. They now only meet in the regular season every four years when the NFC West plays the AFC West, or in the Super Bowl.

Regular season

Schedule

Game summaries

Week 1: vs. Seattle Seahawks

With the win, the 49ers started the season 1–0.

Week 2: vs. Dallas Cowboys

With the loss, the 49ers fell to 1–1.

Week 3: at Cincinnati Bengals

With the win, the 49ers improved to 2–1.

Week 4: at Philadelphia Eagles

With the comeback win, the 49ers improved to 3–1.

Week 5: vs. Tampa Bay Buccaneers

With the win, the 49ers improved to 4–1.

Week 6: at Detroit Lions

With the win, the 49ers went into their bye week at 5–1.

Week 8: vs. Cleveland Browns

With the win, the 49ers improved to 6–1.

Week 9: at Washington Redskins

With the win, the 49ers improved to 7–1.

Week 10: vs. New York Giants

With the win, the 49ers improved to 8–1.

Week 11: vs. Arizona Cardinals

With this win, the 49ers improve their record to 9–1, securing them their first winning season since 2002.

Week 12: at Baltimore Ravens
Thanksgiving Day Game

Coming off their divisional home win over the Cardinals, head coach Jim Harbaugh and the 49ers flew to M&T Bank Stadium for a Week 12 interconference duel with the Baltimore Ravens and their head coach (Jim's brother) John Harbaugh on Thanksgiving.

San Francisco trailed early in the first quarter as Ravens kicker Billy Cundiff got a 39-yard field goal, yet the 49ers answered with a 45-yard field goal from kicker David Akers.  Baltimore struck back in the second quarter with Cundiff making a 23-yard field goal.

San Francisco began the third quarter with a 52-yard field goal from Akers, but the Ravens opened the fourth quarter with quarterback Joe Flacco completing an 8-yard touchdown pass to tight end Dennis Pitta, followed by Cundiff nailing a 39-yard field goal.  The Niners tried to rally, but Baltimore's defense held on to preserve the win.

With the loss, the 49ers fell to 9–2.

These two teams would meet again a year later in Super Bowl XLVII with the 49ers falling short 34–31.

Week 13: vs. St. Louis Rams

With the shutout win, not only did the 49ers improve to 10–2, but they also clinched 1st place in the NFC West.

Week 14: at Arizona Cardinals

With the loss, the 49ers fell to 10–3.

Week 15: vs. Pittsburgh Steelers

The 49ers traveled home for a game on Monday Night Football against the Steelers.  It was delayed due to a power outage in their stadium.  The lights went off again in the 2nd quarter when the 49ers were leading 6–0, which eventually became the score at halftime.  In the 2nd half the 49ers would go on a 14 to 3 run to make the final score 20–3 and improve their record to 11–3.

Week 16: at Seattle Seahawks

With the win, the 49ers improved to 12–3 and swept the Seahawks for the first time since 2006. The 49ers would not win at CenturyLink Field again until 2019.

Week 17: at St. Louis Rams

With the win, the 49ers finished their season at 13–3 as they swept the Rams for the first time since 2009 and captured the NFC's #2 playoff seed.

Standings

Postseason

Schedule

Game summaries

NFC Divisional Playoffs: vs. #3 New Orleans Saints
{{Americanfootballbox
 |titlestyle=;text-align:center;
 |state=autocollapse
 |title=NFC Divisional Round Playoff Game: New Orleans Saints at San Francisco 49ers – Game summary
 |date=January 14, 2012
 |time=1:30 p.m. PST
 |road=Saints
 |R1=0|R2=14|R3=0|R4=18
 |home=49ers
 |H1=14|H2=3|H3=3|H4=16
 |stadium=Candlestick Park, San Francisco, California
 |attendance=69,732
 |weather=, sunny
 |referee=John Parry
 |TV=Fox
 |TVAnnouncers=Kenny Albert, Daryl Johnston, & Tony Siragusa
 |reference=
 |scoring=First quarter SF – Vernon Davis 49-yard pass from Alex Smith (David Akers kick), 49ers 7–0, Drive: 2 plays, 54 yards, 0:46. SF – Michael Crabtree 4-yard catch from Alex Smith (David Akers kick), 49ers 14–0, Drive: 3 plays, 4 yards, 0:15.Second quarter SF – David Akers 21-yard field goal, 49ers 17–0, Drive: 4 plays, 6 yards, 1:23. NO – Jimmy Graham 14-yard pass from Drew Brees (John Kasay kick), 49ers 17–7, Drive: 9 plays, 80 yards, 4:40. NO – Marques Colston 25-yard pass from Drew Brees (John Kasay kick), 49ers 17–14, Drive: 7 plays, 66 yards, 3:04.Third quarter SF – David Akers 41-yard field goal, 49ers 20–14, Drive: 4 plays, 3 yards, 0:59.Fourth quarter NO – John Kasay 48-yard field goal, 49ers 20–17, Drive: 9 plays, 37 yards, 0:59. SF – David Akers 37-yard field goal, 49ers 23–17, Drive: 5 plays, 45 yards, 3:02 NO – Darren Sproles 44-yard pass from Drew Brees (John Kasay kick), Saints 24–23, Drive: 9 plays, 79 yards, 3:34. SF – Alex Smith 28-yard run (2-point conversion failed), 49ers 29–24, Drive: 6 plays, 80 yards, 1:51. NO – Jimmy Graham 66-yard pass from Drew Brees (Drew Brees pass to Darren Sproles for two-point conversion), Saints 32–29, Drive: 4 plays, 88 yards, 0:34. SF – Vernon Davis 14-yard pass from Alex Smith (David Akers kick), 49ers 36–32, Drive: 7 plays, 85 yards, 1:28. |stats=
Top passers
 NO – Drew Brees – 40/63, 462 yards, 4 touchdowns, 2 interceptions
 SF – Alex Smith – 24/42, 299 yards, 3 touchdowns, 0 interceptions
Top rushers
 NO – Chris Ivory – 9 carries, 23 yards, 0 touchdowns
 SF – Frank Gore – 13 carries, 89 yards, 0 touchdowns
Top receivers
 NO – Marques Colston – 9 receptions, 136 yards, 1 touchdown
 SF – Vernon Davis – 7 receptions, 180 yards, 2 touchdowns
Top tacklers
 NO – Malcolm Jenkins – 8 tackles, 0 assists, 1 sack
 SF – Dashon Goldson – 11 tackles, 0 assists, 1 interception
}}
Alex Smith's 14-yard touchdown pass to tight end Vernon Davis with 9 seconds left gave San Francisco their first playoff win since 2002 at the end of a wild, back and forth final quarter which featured four lead changes in a span of 3:53. Sports writers and 49ers fans have taken to referring Davis' catch as The Catch III'', as it occurred four days after the 30th anniversary of The Catch – Joe Montana's famous game-winning touchdown pass to Dwight Clark in the 1981 NFC Championship game against the Dallas Cowboys, one of the most famous plays in San Francisco 49ers history as it helped propel the 49ers to their first-ever Super Bowl, with both plays occurring with the 49ers trailing with less than a minute to play and facing 3rd down and 3 yards to go. This game was voted the number 1 game of 2011 by NFL.com. (The Catch II refers to Steve Young's game-winning pass to Terrell Owens in the 1998 NFC Divisional Playoff against the Green Bay Packers.) With the win, the 49ers improved to 14–3 and faced the New York Giants at Candlestick Park in the NFC Championship Game.

NFC Championship: vs. #4 New York Giants

For the fifth time in conference championship history and for the third time in five years, overtime decided the game, and as it was in the 2007 NFC Championship Game, a field goal by Lawrence Tynes was the winning score as the Giants defeated the 49ers for their fifth NFC Championship Game victory. The Giants became the third team in NFL history to advance to the Super Bowl with fewer than 10 wins during the regular season, joining the 1979 Los Angeles Rams and the 2008 Arizona Cardinals.

With Ted Ginn Jr. injured, Rookie Kyle Williams started at wide receiver and performed punt returns in the NFC Championship Game. He lost two fumbles returning punts, including one in overtime that preceded the game-winning field goal by the Giants. His other fumble in the fourth quarter was followed by a Giants' touchdown to retake the lead, 17–14. QB Alex Smith defended Williams, saying: "Offensively we weren't good enough today. We didn't get it done .... You can't put it on [Williams]". The 49ers did not make a 3rd down conversion until the 4th quarter.  The 49ers' season ended with a 14–4 record.

Team statistics
 Set franchise and NFL record for fewest turnovers in a season (10)
 Fewest rushing touchdowns allowed in the NFL since 1978 (3)
 Most consecutive games not allowing a rushing touchdown since 1970 (15)
 Highest turnover differential in franchise history (+28)
 Set franchise record of not allowing a 100-yard rusher in 36 consecutive games (dating back to 2009)
 NFL record set for most field goals made and attempted in a single season (David Akers, 44 out of 52)

Notes and references

External links

 2011 San Francisco 49ers at ESPN
 2011 San Francisco 49ers at Football Reference

San Francisco
NFC West championship seasons
San Francisco 49ers seasons
2011 in San Francisco
2011 in sports in California